Intha and Danu constitute southern Burmish languages of Shan State, Burma, spoken by the Danu and Intha people. They are considered dialects of Burmese by the Government of Myanmar.

Danu is spoken by the Danu people, Intha by the Intha, a group of Bamar descendants who migrated to Inle Lake in Shan State. Both are spoken by about 100,000. Both are characterized by a retention of the  medial (for the following consonant clusters in Intha). Examples include:
"full": Standard Burmese  → , from old Burmese 
"ground": Standard Burmese  → , from old Burmese 

There is no voicing with the presence of either aspirated or unaspirated consonants. For instance,  (Buddha) is pronounced  in standard Burmese, but  in Intha. This is probably due to influence from the Shan language.

Rhymes
Rhyme correspondences to standard Burmese follow these patterns:

Vocabulary
Danu has noticeable vocabulary differences from standard Burmese, spanning areas such as kinship terms, food, flora and fauna, and daily objects.

Kinship terms

References

Burmese language